Whitehill is a village and civil parish in the East Hampshire district of Hampshire, England, on the historic highway (now the A325) between Petersfield and Farnham.

For more information on Whitehill-Bordon and the eco-town proposal, see Bordon.

History
Lying on the main road between Petersfield and Farnham, now the A325, there had been a hostelry, the Prince of Wales, at what was to become Whitehill. With the development of Bordon and Longmoor Military Camps between 1899 and 1903, Whitehill, lying between the two, began to develop.
Whitehill became a civil parish in 1928, having formerly been part of the parishes of Headley and Selborne. By 1931, the population of the civil parish was 4,661 in 631 households. In 1932 a police station and court house were built, but courts were later held at Alton. The parish council changed its name to Whitehill Town Council in 1991. Its area is approximately 8 square miles.

Transport
Both Bordon and Whitehill straddle the very busy A325 road and the A3 road London to Portsmouth road passes through the parish (though not the village itself). The completion of the Hindhead Tunnel in July 2011 has improved road access to London, while also removing through-traffic taking the A325 through Bordon to avoid frequent delays at traffic lights in Hindhead; including some Guildford and M25-bound traffic from the south diverting via Farnham.

The town used to have its own railway station on the Longmoor Military Railway but this closed in 1969. The Rail Delivery Group has proposed that a new railway line serve the town.

There was a bus link to Liphook railway station which was discontinued in May 2009. Stagecoach South bus 18 passes through the town on the way from Haslemere to Farnham and Aldershot. Stagecoach bus 13 passes through as it travels between Liphook and Alton.

References

External links

 Whitehill Town Council website

Villages in Hampshire